

Custon Conservation Park is a protected area in the Australian state of South Australia located in the state's Limestone Coast in the gazetted locality of Custon about  south of the town centre in Wolseley and about  south of the municipal seat of Bordertown.

The conservation park occupies land in the Section 903 and Allotment 2 in Deposited Plan 36724 of the cadastral unit of the Hundred of Tatiara. It is bounded by Bangham Road on its western side and by Pier Point Road on its northern side.

The land originally gained protected area status in 2007, when crown land in section 903 was gazetted as the Custon Conservation Park and was enlarged in 2016 by the addition of crown land in the Allotment 2 in Deposited Plan 36724.

The conservation park contains an “ecological community” consisting of “a grassy woodland” of grey box which is listed as ‘Endangered’ under the state's National Parks and Wildlife Act 1972 with buloke being a "co-dominant tree species.” As of 2014, the Government of South Australia has been using fire as “part of an integrated management strategy to maintain the Grey-box Grassy Woodland association.”

The conservation park is classified as an IUCN Category III protected area.

References

External links
Webpage for the Custon Conservation Park on the Protected Planet website

Conservation parks of South Australia
Protected areas established in 2007
2007 establishments in Australia
Limestone Coast